Bounkou Camara (born February 6, 1988) is a track and field sprint athlete who competes internationally for Mauritania.

Camara represented Mauritania at the 2008 Summer Olympics in Beijing. She competed at the 100 metres sprint and placed 9th in her heat without advancing to the second round. She ran the distance in a time of 13.69 seconds.

References

External links
 

1988 births
Living people
Mauritanian female sprinters
Olympic athletes of Mauritania
Athletes (track and field) at the 2008 Summer Olympics
World Athletics Championships athletes for Mauritania
Olympic female sprinters